Whalleyana toni is a species of moth in the genus Whalleyana. It was described by Pierre Viette in 1977. It is found in Madagascar.

References

Obtectomera
Moths described in 1977
Moths of Madagascar
Taxa named by Pierre Viette